Tirana International Hotel (also called in) is a hotel located in Tirana, Albania on the corner between central Skanderbeg Square and Zogu I Boulevard. Originally built in 1979 in a Soviet-era architectural style, it was named Hotel Tirana,. In 2001 the hotel was renovated by an Italian company and now it is a 4-star hotel.
Tirana International has 168 rooms on 15 floors.

History

The Tirana International Hotel was built in 1979 during the period of communism in Albania. The hotel was designed by Valentina Pistoli, an Albanian architect born in Korce, Albania and was built by the Albanian government. The building was one of the biggest buildings in Albania during communist times. During communist times, it was open to few people from outside of Albanian borders such as business representatives and foreign government officials, and was also open to citizens of Albania. In the 1980s, the Hotel Tirana was a popular meeting place of members of the Politburo - secret underground escapes made for their safety.

See also
 List of tallest buildings in Albania

References

Hotels in Tirana
Hotels in Albania
Hotels established in 1979
1979 establishments in Albania
Skyscrapers in Albania